3-Methoxy-4-hydroxyhippuric acid is one of the main catechins metabolites found in humans after consumption of green tea infusions.

See also
 Hippuric acid

References

Benzamides
Acetic acids
Phenol ethers
Phenols